Uzoma Dozie (born 2 November 1969) is a banker, tech investor and financial inclusion advocate. He is the CEO and Founder of Sparkle, a financial technology community and 'ecosystem'. Before launching Sparkle in 2019, he was the GMD and Bank CEO of Diamond Bank from 2014 and successfully implemented a merger with Access Bank Plc in 2018. While at Diamond Bank, Uzoma also served as Executive Director of Corporate Banking and Executive Director of Regional Business Lagos & West Regions.

Early life 
Uzoma was born in London, United Kingdom to Pascal Dozie, the founder of Diamond Bank.

Career
Following his time in the Nigerian banking sector, Uzoma Dozie launched Sparkle, the mobile-first platform which is focused on Nigeria’s retail sector and will tackle how retailers achieve their daily objectives and scale their businesses. In addition to the typical current and savings accounts, the platform provides a suite of innovative lifestyle services such as inventory management, invoicing statements, foreign exchange services and a POS-via-mobile function.

He is also known for investing in a number of Nigerian technology start-ups through his angel fund, Black Knights.

Public life 
Uzoma is also on the Board of Women’s World Banking and regularly speaks at conferences and events around the world, on the subject of financial inclusion, technology and how technology can scale.

He is also a well-known advocate for showcasing technology start-up CEOs and has fronted an online TV show called Tech Turks for a number of years, whereby he discusses challenges and opportunities of building tech businesses in Nigeria, with some of the country’s leading entrepreneurs.  

He also launched TechFest in 2018 bringing together leading dignitaries of Nigeria’s technology and business sectors.

References

1969 births
Living people
Nigerian economists
Nigerian bankers
People from London
Nigerian chief executives
Angel investors
Nigerian venture capitalists
Alumni of the University of Reading
Alumni of University College London
English people of Nigerian descent
Alumni of Imperial College London